Lerina is a monotypic moth genus in the family Erebidae. Its only species, Lerina incarnata, the crimson-bodied lichen moth, is found in Mexico and southern Arizona. Both the genus and species were first described by Francis Walker in 1854.

As a caterpillar, it is orange yellowish with dark dots, and feeds on Asclepias linaria, a species of milkweed.

The wings are metallic bluish green. The head, thorax and abdomen are thickly clothed with crimson hairs, the thorax with a black dorsal stripe. The palpi, proboscis, antennae and legs are black.

References

External links

Phaegopterina
Monotypic moth genera
Moths of North America